James Phillips (born June 11, 1980) is a German heavyweight kickboxer of African American descent, currently competing in K-1. He is former European muay thai champion and two time K-1 Croatia tournament champion. He is trained by Michael Damboer and fights out of Thai-Bombs Mannheim.

Biography and career

James Phillips wurde am 11. 06. 1980 in Mannheim/Deutschland als Sohn einer deutschen Mutter und eines Afro-Amerikanischen Vaters geboren.

Bereits im jugendlichen Alter von 11 Jahren entdeckte er die Faszination des Kampfsports für sich. Die ersten vier Jahre trainierte er vor allem Karate, erweiterte aber das Training um weitere Kampfkunst-Arten wie Judo, JKD, Kali, Wing Tsung, Aikido und Kickboxen.

Im Alter von nur 17 Jahren entdeckte er zusätzlich die Kampfsportart “Muay Thai” für sich, in der er in den kommenden Jahren zahlreiche Siege feiern durfte. Während der Amateurlaufbahn wurde er im Jahr 2002 unter anderem auch Muay Thai Europameister.

Als sportbegeisterter Kämpfer komplettierte er seine Techniken noch mit klassischem Boxen (Schwergewicht) und holte sich auch hierfür zwei Meistertitel ab.

James kämpfte von 1999 – 2003 in der deutschen Nationalmannschaft.

Mit den Kenntnissen und sportlichen Fähigkeiten und Erfolgen wandte sich James auch den K1 – Kämpfen zu. Hier erlangte er zahlreiche weitere Meistertitel, unter anderem ist er aktuell der amtierende Weltmeister im K-1 – 86 Kg.  Außerdem wurde er zwei mal Europmeister im Kickboxen.

Das hohe Engagement im Kampfsport und die unglaublichen Erfolge führten dazu, das James sein Wissen um die Techniken und sein Können so perfektionierte, dass er die von ihm praktizierten Kampfkünste weitergeben kann. Deshalb gründete er im Jahr 2010 das “Team Phillips Fight and Fitness” und bildet seither junge Nachwuchstalente aus. Seine ruhige und ausgeglichene Art und die besonders in der Kampfkunst notwendige, weise Überlegenheit zeichnen ihn im Umgang mit seinen Schülern in besonderem Maße aus.

James ist verheiratet und Vater von zwei Töchtern.

James Phillips was born in 1980 in Mannheim, of African American heritage. He started his martial arts training at the age of 13. He studied karate and kickboxing for 4 years before moving on to Muay Thai in 1997 with the Thai-Bombs Mannheim e.V. He also competed in amateur boxing.

He is married and father of two girls.

Titles
Professional
 2014 IKBO World K-1 champion (86 kg)
 2011 Fight Night Mannheim Champion
 2010 IKBF European Kickboxing champion (91 Kg)
 2010 K-1 Collizion Croatia Vize Champion
2009 K-1 ColliZion Croatia champion
 2009 K-1 Collizion World Grand Prix (Final Elimination)
 2007 K-1 Network World Grand Prix
 2007 K-1 Fighting Network Croatia champion
 2006 Fight Night Mannheim champion
 2005 K-1 Final Battle champion
 2005 The Fight Club Riccione tournament champion
 2004 WMC / S1 Heavyweight Tournament Champion
 2003 IKBF European Kickboxing champion (86 kg)

Amateur
 2003 IMTF Teilnahme an der Amateur Muay Thai World championship in Bangkok
 2002 IMTF European Amateur Muaythai champion – (Europameister Muay Thai)
 2001 IMTF Teilnahme an der Amateur Muay Thai World championship in Bangkok
 2000 IMTF German Amateur Muay Thai Champion – (deutscher Meister Muay Thai)
 2000 IMTF Swiss Amateur Muay Thai Champion – (Schweizer Meister Muay Thai)
 2000 IMTF 3. Place European Amateur Muay Thai Champion
 2000 Baden-Württembergischer Amateur Muay Thai Champion
 1999 IMTF Teilnahme an der Amateur Muay Thai World championship in Bangkok
 1999 IMTF German Amateur Muay Thai Champion – (deutscher Meister Muay Thai)
 1999 Bayerischer Amateur Champion
 1998 IMTF German Amateur Muay Thai Vize Champion
 1998 Baden-Württembergischer Amateur Muay Thai Champion

Kickboxing record

|-
|-  bgcolor="FFBBBB"
| 2016-05-07 || Loss ||align=left| Bogdan Stoica || Showdown Fight Night || Mannheim, Germany || KO || 2 || 
|-
|- bgcolor="#CCFFCC"
| 2015-09-12 || Win ||align=left| Errol Konning  || It's Fight Time 2 || Darmstadt, Germany || Decision || 3 || 3:00
|- bgcolor="#CCFFCC"
| 2014-04-26 || Win ||align=left| Almedin Hasanagic  || Rhein Neckar Fight Night || Ludwigshafen, Germany || KO || 2 || 
|-
! style=background:white colspan=9 |
|-
|-  bgcolor="FFBBBB"
| 2011-11-19 || Loss ||align=left| Andrei Stoica || SuperKombat World Grand Prix Final 2011 || Darmstadt, Germany || KO (Right High Kick) || 1 || 2:19
|- bgcolor="#CCFFCC"
| 2011-10-15 || Win ||align=left| Michail Tutierev || Fight Night Mannheim || Mannheim, Germany || Decision || 3 || 3:00
|- bgcolor="#CCFFCC"
| 2011-10-15 || Win ||align=left| Ladin Etic || Fight Night Mannheim || Mannheim, Germany || Decision || 3 || 3:00
|- bgcolor="#CCFFCC"
| 2010-03-27 || Win ||align=left| Hicham Tourar || K1 Alpes || Bolzano, Italy || Decision || 3 || 3:00
|-  bgcolor="#CCFFCC"
| 2010-09-25 || Win ||align=left| Jaroslaw Zawodni || Fight Night Mannheim || Mannheim, Germany || TKO (Referee stoppage) || 5 || 3:00
|-  bgcolor="#FFBBBB"
| 2010-06-24 || Loss ||align=left| Ondrej Hutnik  || WFCA Prague || Prague, Czech Republic || Decision (Unanimous) || 3 || 3:00
|- bgcolor="#FFBBBB"
| 2010-03-27 || Loss ||align=left| Agron Preteni  || K-1 ColliZion 2010 Croatia || Split, Croatia || Decision (Unanimous) || 3 || 3:00
|-
! style=background:white colspan=9 |
|-
|- bgcolor="#CCFFCC"
| 2010-03-27 || Win ||align=left| Andrei Stoica || K-1 ColliZion 2010 Croatia || Split, Croatia || Decision || 3 || 3:00
|-  bgcolor="#FFBBBB"
| 2009-10-24 || Loss || align=left| Shamil Abasov || K-1 ColliZion 2009 Final Elimination || Arad, Romania || Decision (Unanimous) || 3 || 3:00
|-  bgcolor="#CCFFCC"
| 2009-08-29 || Win || align=left| Werner Kreiskott || The Night in Löwen || Wuppertal, Germany || KO (High Kick) || 3 || N/A
|-  bgcolor="#FFBBBB"
| 2009-07-03 ||Loss ||align=left| Coco Rus || K-1 ColliZion 2009 Sarajevo || Sarajevo, Bosnia and Herzegovina || Decision (Majority) || 3 ||3:00
|-  bgcolor="#CCFFCC"
| 2009-06-06 || Win ||align=left| Tarik Kuzucu || Fightclub Nürnberg || Nuremberg, Germany || KO (High kick) || 1 ||
|-  bgcolor="#CCFFCC"
| 2009-05-09 || Win ||align=left| Yahya Gülay || Mix Fight Gala VIII || Darmstadt, Germany || TKO (Corner stoppage/Gülay gave up) || 1 || 3:00
|-  bgcolor="#CCFFCC"
| 2009-03-21 || Win ||align=left| Patrick Berger || K-1 ColliZion 2009 Croatia || Split, Croatia || Decision (Unanimous) || 3 || 3:00
|-
! style=background:white colspan=9 |
|-
|-  bgcolor="#CCFFCC"
| 2009-03-21 || Win ||align=left| David Dancrade || K-1 ColliZion 2009 Croatia || Split, Croatia || TKO (Referee stoppage) || 3 ||
|-  bgcolor="#CCFFCC"
| 2008-12-13 || Win ||align=left| Serdar Karaca || The Champions Club || Bamberg, Germany || KO (Left high kick) || 2 || 2:37
|-  bgcolor="#CCFFCC"
| 2008-10-25 || Win ||align=left| Jimmy Sidony || Mix Fight Gala VII || Darmstadt, Germany || TKO (Referee stoppage) || 1 || 0:55
|-  bgcolor="#FFBBBB"
| 2007-11-03 || Loss ||align=left| Daniel Ghiţă || Local Kombat 27 "Porţile de fier" || Drobeta-Turnu Severin, Romania || KO (Low kicks) || 2 || 1:58
|-  bgcolor="#CCFFCC"
| 2007-09-01 || Win ||align=left| Yussuf Belmikdan || Fight Night Mannheim "The Battle Continues" || Mannheim, Germany || KO (Knees) || 2 || 2:48
|-
! style=background:white colspan=9 |
|-
|-  bgcolor="#CCFFCC"
| 2007-09-01 || Win ||align=left| Florian Ogunade || Fight Night Mannheim "The Battle Continues" || Mannheim, Germany || Ext. R Decision (Split) || 4 || 3:00
|-  bgcolor="#FFBBBB"
| 2007-06-23 || Loss ||align=left| Zabit Samedov || K-1 World Grand Prix 2007 in Amsterdam || Amsterdam, Netherlands || Decision (Unanimous) || 3 || 3:00
|-  bgcolor="#CCFFCC"
| 2007-03-10 || Win ||align=left| Ante Varnica || K-1 Fighting Network Croatia 2007 || Split, Croatia || KO (Right hooks) || 2 || 1:01
|-
! style=background:white colspan=9 |
|-
|-  bgcolor="#CCFFCC"
| 2007-03-10 || Win ||align=left| Damir Tovarovic || K-1 Fighting Network Croatia 2007 || Split, Croatia || TKO (Knee to the body) || 1 || 1:33
|-  bgcolor="#CCFFCC"
| 2007-03-10 || Win ||align=left| Dragan Jovanović || K-1 Fighting Network Croatia 2007 || Split, Croatia || Decision (Unanimous) || 3 || 3:00
|-  bgcolor="#CCFFCC"
| 2007-01-27 || Win ||align=left| Roman Kupcak || Fight Night || Mannheim, Germany || KO (High kick) || 2 || N/A
|-  bgcolor="#CCFFCC"
| 2006-09-16 || Win ||align=left| Mohamed Oudriss || Fight Night Mannheim 2006 || Mannheim, Germany || TKO (Corner stoppage) || 2 ||
|-
! style=background:white colspan=9 |
|-
|-  bgcolor="#CCFFCC"
| 2007-09-16 || Win ||align=left| Abdel Lahmizi || Fight Night Mannheim 2006 || Mannheim, Germany || TKO (Corner stoppage) || 2 || 3:00
|-  bgcolor="#FFBBBB"
| 2006-07-08 || Loss ||align=left| Ergin Solmaz || WPKC & WMC Grand Prix Tournament, Quarter Finals || Riccione, Italy || Decision (Unanimous) || 3 || 3:00
|-  bgcolor="#FFBBBB"
| 2006-06-03 || Loss ||align=left| Azem Maksutaj || K-1 Gala in Luzern || Luzern, Switzerland || Decision (Unanimous) || 3 || 3:00
|-  bgcolor="#FFBBBB"
| 2006-05-20 || Loss ||align=left| Thomas Rasmussen || K-1 Scandinavia Grand Prix 2006 || Stockholm, Sweden || Decision (Unanimous) || 3 || 3:00
|-  bgcolor="#CCFFCC"
| 2006-03-12 || Win ||align=left| Christian Lüdeke || Fight Night Leverkusen || Leverkusen, Germany || TKO (Low kicks) || 3 || 1:00
|-  bgcolor="#FFBBBB"
| 2006-02-17 || Loss ||align=left| Azem Maksutaj || K-1 European League 2006 in Bratislava || Bratislava, Slovakia || Decision (Unanimous) || 3 || 3:00
|-  bgcolor="#CCFFCC"
| 2005-12-10 || Win ||align=left| Asmir Burgic || K-1 Final Battle 2005 || Lübeck, Germany || TKO (Kick to the body) || 2 ||
|-
! style=background:white colspan=9 |
|-
|-  bgcolor="#CCFFCC"
| 2005-12-10 || Win ||align=left| Waldemar Dohmke || K-1 Final Battle 2005 || Lübeck, Germany || Decision (Unanimous) || 3 || 3:00
|-  bgcolor="#CCFFCC"
| 2005-10-29 || Win ||align=left| Rodney Faverus || K-1 New Talents 2005 in Germany || Koblenz, Germany || Decision (Unanimous) || 3 || 3:00
|-  bgcolor="#CCFFCC"
| 2005-06-25 || Win ||align=left| Attila Karacs || The Fight Club Riccione 4-men tournament || Riccione, Italy || Decision (Unanimous) || 3 || 3:00
|-
! style=background:white colspan=9 |
|-
|-  bgcolor="#CCFFCC"
| 2005-06-25 || Win ||align=left| Petr Vondracek || The Fight Club Riccione 4-men tournament || Riccione, Italy || TKO (Doctor stoppage) || 2 || 2:16
|-  bgcolor="#FFBBBB"
| 2005-05-07 || Loss ||align=left| Xhavit Bajrami || Kickboxgala in Bern || Bern, Switzerland || Decision (Split) || 3 || 3:00
|-  bgcolor="#CCFFCC"
| 2004-12-17 || Win ||align=left| Christian Lüdeke || Muay Thai Gala in Bonn || Bonn, Germany || TKO (Doctor stop/leg injury) || 1 || 3:00
|-  bgcolor="#CCFFCC"
| 2004-10-30 || Win ||align=left| Henriques Zowa || MTBD Jubiläumsgala || Kaiserslautern, Germany || Decision (Unanimous) || 3 || 3:00
|-  bgcolor="#CCFFCC"
| 2003-04-13 || Win ||align=left| Enrico Grootenhuis || Kickboxgala in Dresden || Dresden, Germany || KO (Right cross) || 1 || N/A
|-
! style=background:white colspan=9 |
|-
|-  bgcolor="#CCFFCC"
| 2002-10-28 || Win ||align=left| Unknown Fighter || IMTF European championships || Portugal || Decision || 4 || 2:00
|-
! style=background:white colspan=9 |
|-
|-  bgcolor="#CCFFCC"
| 2001-10-27 || Win ||align=left| Mdiba || Kickbox Gala in Ratheim || Ratheim, Germany || Decision || 5 || 3:00
|-
| colspan=9 | Legend:

See also
 List of K-1 Events
 List of K-1 champions
 List of male kickboxers

External links
 Fight & Fitness

References

1980 births
Living people
German Muay Thai practitioners
Sportspeople from Mannheim
German people of African-American descent
German male kickboxers
SUPERKOMBAT kickboxers